Desmond Kwesi Blackmore (born January 12, 1987), known by his stage name D-Black, is an anglophone hip-hop and Afrobeat musician and entrepreneur from Ghana.  He has been described as "a successful entertainment mogul"

Early life

Born Desmond Kwesi Blackmore on 12 January 1987 to Ghanaian & English parents, Blackmore attended Ridge Church School then to Pope John Senior High School and Minor Seminary before the University of Cape Coast  to study B.A Economics and University Of Ghana, Legon  to study BFA Theatre Arts / Music.

Career 
In 2009, D-Black began his career as an independent artist in the group D-Black & Kwaku T releasing a group album ‘Target Practice’. In 2010 D-Black and his rap partner both went solo. He went on to release three albums (Music, Love and Life, The Revelation, Lightwork’ 1 E.P (Smoke and Mirrors) and 1 mix-tape (Hunger & Thirst) over the years. He has been nominated for numerous awards and won several, including the 2011 BET Awards.

He has collaborated with some of African acts including Davido, Mayorkun, M.I, Phyno, Ice Prince, Seyi Shay from Nigeria, Cassper Nyovest, Bucie, HHP from South Africa, Stanley Enow from Cameroon, Stella Mwangi from Kenya and Vanessa Mdee from Tanzania as well as Sarkodie, Shatta Wale, StoneBwoy, Castro, Bisa Kdei, Efya, King Promise, Kuami Eugene E.L, Kwabena Kwabena, VVIP and more from his homeland Ghana.

Black Avenue Muzik
D-Black is the CEO of record label Black Avenue Muzik, with act including himself, DJ Breezy, Sefa, Ms. Forson, Osayo & rapper Nina Ricchie, as well as music producer Rony, Turn Me Up. Former acts include Joey B, Freda Rhymz, Dahlin Gage & Wisa Greid. It won record label of the year at the 2018 Ghana - Naija Entertainment Awards in Lagos, Nigeria. and was nominated for the record label of the year at the 2019 Ghana Entertainment Awards in New York.

Other ventures

Black Avenue Clothing
Founded in 2012, a design company, marketer and importer of men and women's apparel.

Livewire Events
Livewire Events is an events management company founded in 2015. In 2015 they produced the Bukom Banku vs Ayittey Powers boxing match at the Kumasi Sports Stadium. It included performances from Sarkodie, Shatta Wale and Efya. Other notable events include the 2018 Kundum Festival Jam in Axim for the Ministry of Tourism.

Black Avenue Films/TV
Produced Why Should I Get Married movie starring John Dumelo, Maria Nepembe, Princess Shyngle, Eya, Prince David Osei, and  The EFGH Show hosted by Peace Hyde in 2015.

Discography

Albums
Target Practice (2009)
Music, Love & Life (2010)
The Revelation (2012)
Lightwork (2016)
Hunger & Thirst Mixtape (2017)
Smoke & Mirrors E.P (2019)

Singles
"Move" w/ Kwaku T (2009)
Breathe" w/ Kwaku T (2010)
"Somebody" ft. Kwabena Kwabena (2011)
"Get On the Dancefloor" ft. D Cryme (2011)
"Ma Me Five" (2011)
"Asabone" ft. Reggie Rockstone (2011)
"My Kinda Girl" ft. Sarkodie (2012)
"Change Your Life" ft. E.L (2012)
"Vera" ft. Joey B (2012)
"Black Clouds' ft. Waje (2013)
"Conference Call" ft. Kwaw Kese, Sarkodie (2013)
"Woara" ft. Kesse (2013)
"Setewaa D3nky3" (2013)
"Party Gbee" (2013)
"Carry Go" ft. Davido (2013)
"Personal Person" ft. Castro (2014)
"Seihor" w/ Castro (2014)
"Kotomoshi (2015)
"Champ" ft. M.I Abaga (2016)
"Omega" ft. Sarkodie (2016)
"Bottles" ft. Medikal (2017)
"Julie" ft. Bisa KDei (2017)
"Makoma" ft. Mayorkun (2017)
"Nobody" ft. King Promise (2018)
"Badder" ft. Kuami Eugene(2019)
"Dat Ting" ft. Joey B (2019)
"Obiba" ft. Kidi (2019)
"Miracle" (2019)
"Falaa" ft. Medikal (2019)
"Heaven Or Hell" ft. Sefa (2019)
"Stay" ft. Simi (2019)
"Sheege" ft. Gyakie (2021)

Awards and nominations

References

External links

21st-century Ghanaian male singers
21st-century Ghanaian singers
Ghanaian songwriters
Ghanaian record producers
1987 births
Living people
People from Accra
Pope John Senior High School and Minor Seminary alumni
Ridge Church School alumni